Bizhaem (also Romanized as Bīzhā’em; also known as Baḩā’em, Bīḩan, Bījā’em, and Bījān) is a village in Mud Rural District, Mud District, Sarbisheh County, South Khorasan Province, Iran. At the 2006 census, its population was 196, in 70 families.

References 

Populated places in Sarbisheh County